The Roland SH-101 is an analog synthesizer manufactured by the Roland Corporation between 1982 and 1986. Though it was something of a commercial failure during the time of its manufacture, it later became a staple of electronic music in the 1990s, particularly house music.

Sound and features
The SH-101 is monophonic, meaning it can only play one note at a time. It has a single oscillator (the Curtis CEM3340) and a sub-oscillator, a low-pass filter, a mixer allowing users to blend different waveforms plus a noise generator, and an arpeggiator and sequencer. An ADSR envelope generator controls the filter and VCA, and the filter, VCA, pitch and pulse width can be controlled with an LFO. Users can attach an optional handgrip with modulation controls and shoulder strap to play the SH-101 as a keytar, and it could also be powered via battery. According to MusicRadar, the SH-101 has "snappy and razor-sharp" bass, "squelchy and expressive" leads, and a "piercing yet smooth" filter.

Release 
The SH-101 launched in the US at $495 and in UK at £249, making it much more affordable than the popular digital synthesisers of the time. Two limited edition versions were also released in both red and blue colours, in contrast to the original grey. Roland marketed the SH-101 to the emerging keytar market, with magazine slogans such as "freedom for expression" and “[the 101] takes you where you want to go". However, it was outsold by the digital Yamaha DX7 and was discontinued in 1986.

Legacy 
During the 1990s resurgence of analogue synthesisers, the 101 became a staple in dance music studios. It was used by many famous electronic musicians. 

In 2014, MusicRadar wrote: "Some inexpensive synths were brilliant 'for the price'. The Roland SH-101 was brilliant, period. Never a rock star's instrument like the Minimoog or Prophet-5, the 101 was a synthesiser for the rest of us, and a damned fine one, too." In 2016, Fact named the SH-101 one of the 14 most important synthesisers in history.

Famous users 
Famous musicians that have used the SH-101 include:

Nitzer Ebb, Aphex Twin Vince Clarke of Erasure, Paul Frick from Tangerine Dream, Future Sound of London, Orbital, Überzone, The Prodigy, 808 State, The Grid, Cirrus, Eat Static, Jimmy Edgar, Apollo 440, Devo, Union Jack, Luke Vibert, Dirty Vegas, Skinny Puppy, Pig, MSTRKRFT, Josh Wink, Depeche Mode, The Crystal Method,  Astral Projection, Les Rythmes Digitales, Sense Datum, Squarepusher, KMFDM, Freddy Fresh, Lab-4, Jimmy Dickinson Little Angels, The Chemical Brothers, Boards of Canada, The Knife and many others.

Hardware re-issues and recreations 
In 2018, Roland introduced the Boutique SH-01A, a virtual analog synth, based on their Analog Circuit Behavior (ACB) technology. It is available with or without a keyboard.

In 2019, Behringer started producing a clone of SH-101 called MS-101, since the Roland patent had expired. The layout and sound is very close to the original, with the addition of enhancements such as MIDI and USB.

In 2019, Superlative Instruments launched a Kickstarter campaign to produce the SB-1 Space Bee, very similar in layout to the SH-101 with a unique keyboard design and all keys and keyboard in dark gray.

Software emulations 
In June 2020, Roland released Zenology plugins for Roland synths, which includes an SH-101 emulator. Roland claims it is an ultra-detailed replica.

Other software emulators include Togu Audio Line TAL-Bassline-101, D16 Group LuSH-101, and Togu Audio Line TAL-Bassline (a free limited version of the other Togu app).

References

External links 

 Roland SH-101 / SH-01A Facebook User Group
 Vintage Synth Explorer's SH-101 entry
 SH-101 owner's manual
 Din Sync's SH-101 entry

SH-101
Analog synthesizers
Monophonic synthesizers